Jennie Nordin (born 15 May 1993) is a Swedish footballer who plays as a defender for Piteå IF.

Club career 

Impressive performances for the victorious Sweden team at the 2012 UEFA Women's Under-19 Championship made Nordin a transfer target for several leading Damallsvenskan clubs. She opted to join Linköpings FC but missed the first half of the 2013 Damallsvenskan campaign due to injury. She broke into the team in the second half of the season, playing alongside Charlotte Rohlin at centre-back when Nilla Fischer left for VfL Wolfsburg.

In March 2018, Nordin signed for newly-promoted Växjö DFF after spending two years in Norway's Toppserien with Vålerenga.

Personal life 
Nordin's father Krister Nordin was also a professional footballer. Like Jennie, Krister spent much of his career with AIK. The first team that Jennie ever played for was Solrød FC in Denmark, as the family had moved there when her father was playing for Brøndby IF.

Honours 
Sweden U19
Winner
 UEFA Women's Under-19 Championship: 2012

References

External links 

 
Profile at Swedish Football Association (SvFF) 

1993 births
Living people
Swedish women's footballers
Linköpings FC players
AIK Fotboll (women) players
Växjö DFF players
Vålerenga Fotball Damer players
Damallsvenskan players
Toppserien players
Swedish expatriate women's footballers
Expatriate women's footballers in Norway
Swedish expatriate sportspeople in Norway
Women's association football defenders
Footballers from Stockholm